James Riddle Hoffa (February 14, 1913 – disappeared July 30, 1975; declared dead July 30, 1982) was an American labor union leader who served as the president of the International Brotherhood of Teamsters (IBT) from 1957 until 1971.

From an early age, Hoffa was a union activist, and he became an important regional figure with the IBT by his mid-twenties. By 1952, he was the national vice-president of the IBT and between 1957 and 1971 he was its general president. He secured the first national agreement for teamsters' rates in 1964 with the National Master Freight Agreement. He played a major role in the growth and the development of the union, which eventually became the largest by membership in the United States, with over 2.3 million members at its peak, during his terms as its leader.

Hoffa became involved with organized crime from the early years of his Teamsters work, a connection that continued until his disappearance in 1975. He was convicted of jury tampering, attempted bribery, conspiracy, and mail and wire fraud in 1964 in two separate trials. He was imprisoned in 1967 and sentenced to 13 years. In mid-1971, he resigned as president of the union as part of a commutation agreement with U.S. president Richard Nixon and was released later that year, but Hoffa was barred from union activities until 1980. Hoping to regain support and to return to IBT leadership, he unsuccessfully tried to overturn the order.

Hoffa disappeared on July 30, 1975. It is generally accepted that he was murdered by the Mafia, and in 1982 he was declared legally dead. Hoffa's legacy and  the circumstances of his disappearance continue to stir debate.

Early life and family

Hoffa was born in Brazil, Indiana, on February 14, 1913, to John and Viola (née Riddle) Hoffa. His father, who was of German descent from what is now referred to as the Pennsylvania Dutch, died in 1920 from lung disease when Hoffa was seven years old. His mother was of Irish ancestry. The family moved to Detroit in 1924, where Hoffa was raised and lived for the rest of his life. He left school at the age of 14 and began working in full-time manual labor jobs to help support his family.

Hoffa married Josephine Poszywak, an 18-year-old Detroit laundry worker of Polish heritage, in Bowling Green, Ohio, on September 25, 1937. The couple had met six months earlier during a nonunionized laundry workers' strike action. They had two children: a daughter, Barbara Ann Crancer, and a son, James P. Hoffa. The Hoffas paid $6,800 in 1939 for a modest home in northwestern Detroit. The family later owned a simple summer lakefront cottage in Orion Township, Michigan, north of Detroit.

Early union activity
Hoffa began union organizational work at the grassroots level as a teenager through his job with a grocery chain, which paid substandard wages and offered poor working conditions with minimal job security. The workers were displeased with that situation and tried to organize a union to better their lot. Although Hoffa was young, his courage and approachability in that role impressed fellow workers, and he rose to a leadership position. By 1932, after refusing to work for an abusive shift foreman, Hoffa left the grocery chain, partly because of his union activities. He was then invited to become an organizer with Local 299 of the Teamsters in Detroit.

Growth of Teamsters
The Teamsters, founded in 1903, had 75,000 members in 1933. As a result of Hoffa's work with other union leaders to consolidate local union trucker groups into regional sections and then into a national body, which Hoffa ultimately completed over two decades, membership grew to 170,000 members by 1936, and three years later, there were 420,000. The number grew steadily during World War II and in the postwar boom to top a million members by 1951.

The Teamsters organized truck drivers and warehousemen throughout the Midwest and then nationwide. Hoffa played a major role in the union's skillful use of "quickie strikes," secondary boycotts, and other means of leveraging union strength at one company, then to move to organize workers, and finally to win contract demands at other companies. That process, which took several years starting in the early 1930s, eventually brought the Teamsters to a position of being one of the most powerful unions in the United States.

Trucking unions in that era were heavily influenced by—and in many cases controlled by elements of—organized crime. For Hoffa to unify and expand trucking unions, he had to make accommodations and arrangements with many gangsters, beginning in the Detroit area. Organized crime influence on the IBT increased as the union itself grew.

Rise to power
Hoffa worked to defend the Teamsters from raids by other unions, including the Congress of Industrial Organizations, and he extended the Teamsters' influence in the Midwest from the late 1930s to the late 1940s. Although he never actually worked as a truck driver, he became president of Local 299 in December 1946. He then rose to lead the combined group of Detroit-area locals shortly afterwards and later advanced to become head of the Michigan Teamsters groups. Meanwhile, Hoffa obtained a deferment from military service in World War II by successfully making a case for his union leadership skills being of more value to the nation by keeping freight running smoothly to assist the war effort.

At the 1952 IBT convention in Los Angeles, Hoffa was selected as national vice-president by incoming president Dave Beck, the successor to Daniel J. Tobin, who had been president since 1907. Hoffa had quelled an internal revolt against Tobin by securing Central States' regional support for Beck at the convention. In exchange, Beck made Hoffa a vice-president.

The IBT moved its headquarters from Indianapolis to Washington, DC, taking over a large office building in the capital in 1955. IBT staff was also meanwhile enlarged, with many lawyers hired to assist with contract negotiations. Following his 1952 election as vice-president, Hoffa began spending more of his time away from Detroit, either in Washington or traveling around the country for his expanded responsibilities. Hoffa's personal lawyer was Bill Bufalino.

Teamsters presidency

Hoffa took over the presidency of the Teamsters in 1957, at the convention in Miami Beach, Florida. Beck, his predecessor, had appeared before the John L. McClellan-led US Senate Select Committee on Improper Activities in Labor or Management Field in March 1957 and took the Fifth Amendment 140 times in response to questions. Beck was under indictment when the IBT convention took place and was convicted and imprisoned in a trial for fraud held in Seattle.

Teamsters expelled from AFL-CIO
The 1957 AFL-CIO convention, held in Atlantic City, New Jersey, voted nearly five to one to expel the IBT. Vice-president Walter Reuther led the fight to oust the IBT on charges of Hoffa's corrupt leadership. President George Meany gave an emotional speech, advocating the removal of the IBT and stating that he could only agree to further affiliation of the Teamsters if they dismissed Hoffa as their president. Meany demanded a response from Hoffa, who replied through the press, "We'll see." At the time, the IBT was bringing in over $750,000 annually to the AFL-CIO.

National Master Freight Agreement
Following his re-election as president in 1961, Hoffa worked to expand the union. In 1964, he succeeded in bringing virtually all over-the-road truck drivers in North America under a single National Master Freight Agreement, which may have been his biggest achievement in a lifetime of union activity. Hoffa then tried to bring airline workers and other transport employees into the union, with limited success. He was then facing immense personal strain as he was under investigation, on trial, launching appeals of convictions, or imprisoned for virtually all of the 1960s.

Hoffa was re-elected without opposition to a third five-year term as president of the IBT, despite having been convicted of jury tampering and mail fraud in court verdicts that were stayed pending review on appeal. Delegates in Miami Beach also elected Frank Fitzsimmons as first vice president, who would become president "if Hoffa has to serve a jail term."

Criminal charges

Hoffa had first faced major criminal investigations in 1957, as a result of the McClellan Committee. On March 14, 1957, Hoffa was arrested for allegedly trying to bribe an aide to the Select Committee. Hoffa denied the charges (and was later acquitted), but the arrest triggered additional investigations and more arrests and indictments over the following weeks. When John F. Kennedy was elected president in 1960, he appointed his younger brother Robert as Attorney General. Robert Kennedy had been frustrated in earlier attempts to convict Hoffa, while working as counsel to the McClellan subcommittee. As attorney general from 1961, Kennedy pursued a strong attack on organized crime and he carried on with a so-called "Get Hoffa" squad of prosecutors and investigators.

Prison sentences

In May 1963, Hoffa was indicted for jury tampering in Tennessee, charged with the attempted bribery of a grand juror during his 1962 conspiracy trial in Nashville. Hoffa was convicted on March 4, 1964, and subsequently sentenced to eight years in prison and a $10,000 fine. While on bail during his appeal, Hoffa was convicted in a second trial held in Chicago, on July 26, 1964, on one count of conspiracy and three counts of mail and wire fraud for improper use of the Teamsters' pension fund, and sentenced to five years in prison.

Hoffa spent the next three years unsuccessfully appealing his 1964 convictions. Appeals filed by his chief counsel, St. Louis defense attorney Morris Shenker, reached the U.S. Supreme Court. He began serving his aggregate prison sentence of 13 years (eight years for bribery, five years for fraud) on March 7, 1967, at the Lewisburg Federal Penitentiary in Pennsylvania.

Appointment of Fitzsimmons as caretaker president

When Hoffa entered prison, Frank Fitzsimmons was named acting president of the union, and Hoffa planned to run the union from prison through Fitzsimmons.  Fitzsimmons was a Hoffa loyalist, fellow Detroit resident, and a longtime member of Teamsters Local 299, who owed his own high position in large part to Hoffa's influence. Despite this, Fitzsimmons soon distanced himself from Hoffa's influence and control after 1967, to Hoffa's displeasure. Fitzsimmons also decentralized power somewhat within the IBT's administration structure, forgoing much of the control Hoffa took advantage of as union president. While still in prison, Hoffa resigned as Teamsters president on June 19, 1971, and Fitzsimmons was elected Teamsters president on July 9, 1971.

After prison
On December 23, 1971, less than five years into his 13-year sentence, Hoffa was released from prison when US President Richard Nixon commuted it to time served. As a result of Hoffa's previous resignation, he was awarded a $1.75 million lump sum termination benefit by the Teamsters Retirement and Family Protection Plan. That type of pension settlement had never occurred with the Teamsters. The IBT then endorsed Nixon, a Republican, in his presidential re-election bid in 1972. In prior elections, the union had normally supported Democratic nominees but had endorsed Nixon in 1960.

Hoffa regained his freedom, but the commutation from Nixon did not allow Hoffa to "engage in the direct or indirect management of any labor organization" until March 6, 1980. Hoffa contended that he had never agreed to that condition. Hoffa accused senior Nixon administration figures, including Attorney General John N. Mitchell and White House Special Counsel Charles Colson, of depriving him of his rights by imposing that condition. It was suspected that the condition had been imposed upon Hoffa because of requests from the Teamsters' leadership, but that was denied by Fitzsimmons. By 1973, Hoffa was planning to seize the presidency of the Teamsters again.

Hoffa sued to invalidate the restriction so that he could reassert his power over the Teamsters. John Dean, former White House counsel to Nixon, was among those called upon for depositions in 1974 court proceedings. Dean, who had become famous as a government witness in prosecutions arising from the Watergate scandal by mid-1973, had drafted the clause in 1971 at Nixon's request. Hoffa ultimately lost his court battle since the court ruled that Nixon had acted within his powers by imposing the restriction, as it had been based on Hoffa's misconduct while he was serving as a Teamsters official.

Hoffa faced immense resistance to his re-establishment of power from many corners and had lost much of his earlier support even in the Detroit area. As a result, he intended to begin his comeback at the local level with Local 299 in Detroit, where he retained some influence. In 1975, Hoffa was working on an autobiography, Hoffa: The Real Story, which was published a few months after his disappearance. He had earlier published a book titled The Trials of Jimmy Hoffa (1970).

Disappearance

Prelude
Hoffa's plans to regain the leadership of the union were met with opposition from several members of the Mafia. One of them was Anthony Provenzano, who had been a Teamsters local leader in New Jersey and a national vice-president of the union during Hoffa's second term as its president. Provenzano had once been a friend of Hoffa's but became an enemy after a reported feud when both were in federal prison at Lewisburg, Pennsylvania, in the 1960s. In 1973 and 1974, Hoffa asked him for his support to regain his former position, but Provenzano refused and threatened Hoffa by reportedly saying he would pull out his guts and kidnap his grandchildren. Provenzano was a caporegime in the New York City Genovese crime family. At least two of Provenzano's union opponents had been murdered, and others who had spoken out against him had been assaulted.

Other Mafia figures who became involved were Anthony Giacalone, an alleged kingpin in the Detroit Mafia, and his younger brother, Vito. The FBI believes that they were positioning themselves as "mediators" between Hoffa and Provenzano. The brothers had made three visits to Hoffa's home at Lake Orion and one to the Guardian Building law offices. Their avowed purpose in meeting Hoffa was to set up a "peace meeting" between Provenzano and Hoffa.  Hoffa's son, James, said, "Dad was pushing so hard to get back in office, I was increasingly afraid that the mob would do something about it." James was convinced that the "peace meeting" was a pretext to Giacalone's "setting Dad up" for a hit since Hoffa had been increasingly uneasy each time the Giacalone brothers arrived.

Events of July 30
Hoffa disappeared on July 30, 1975, after he had gone out to the meeting with Provenzano and Giacalone. The meeting was due to take place at 2:00 p.m. at the Machus Red Fox restaurant in Bloomfield Township, a Detroit suburb. The place was known to Hoffa, as it had been the site of the wedding reception of his son James. Hoffa wrote Giacalone's initials and the time and location of the meeting in his office calendar: "TG—2 p.m.—Red Fox."

Hoffa left his home at 1:15 p.m. Before heading to the restaurant, he stopped at the office of his close friend Louis Linteau, a former president of Teamsters Local 614 who now ran a limousine service. Linteau and Hoffa had been enemies early in their careers but eventually became friends. When Hoffa left prison, Linteau had also become Hoffa's unofficial appointment secretary and arranged a dinner meeting between Hoffa and the Giacalone brothers on July 26 in which they had informed him of the July 30 meeting. Linteau was out to lunch when Hoffa stopped by and so Hoffa talked to some of the staff present and left a message for Linteau before he left for the Machus Red Fox.

Between 2:15 and 2:30 p.m., an annoyed Hoffa called his wife from a payphone on a post in front of Damman Hardware, directly behind the Machus Red Fox, and complained that Giacalone had not shown up and that he had been stood up. His wife told him she had not heard from anyone. He told her he would be home at 4:00 p.m., to grill steaks for dinner. Several witnesses saw Hoffa standing by his car and pacing the restaurant's parking lot. Two men saw Hoffa, recognized him, and stopped to chat with him briefly and to shake his hand. Hoffa also made a call to Linteau in which he again complained that the men were late. Linteau gave the time as 3:30 p.m., but the FBI suspected that it was earlier, based on the timing of other phone calls from Linteau's office from around that time. The FBI estimates that Hoffa left the location without a struggle around 2:45–2:50 p.m. One witness reported seeing Hoffa in the back of a maroon "Lincoln or Mercury" car with three other people.

Investigation
At 7 a.m. the next day, Hoffa's wife called her son and daughter to say that their father had not come home. At 7:20 a.m., Linteau went to the Machus Red Fox and found Hoffa's unlocked car in the parking lot, but there was no sign of Hoffa nor any indication of what had happened to him. He called the police, who later arrived at the scene. The Michigan State Police were brought in, and the FBI was alerted. At 6 p.m., Hoffa's son, James, filed a missing person report. The Hoffa family offered a $200,000 reward for any information about the disappearance.

The primary piece of physical evidence obtained in the investigation was a maroon 1975 Mercury Marquis Brougham, which belonged to Anthony Giacalone's son Joseph. The car had been borrowed earlier that day by Charles "Chuckie" O'Brien to deliver fish. O'Brien was Hoffa's foster son although relations between them had soured in the years preceding Hoffa's disappearance. Investigators and Hoffa's family suspected that O'Brien had a role in Hoffa's disappearance. On August 21, police dogs identified Hoffa's scent in the car.

Giacalone and Provenzano, who denied having scheduled a meeting with Hoffa, were found not to have been near the restaurant that afternoon. Provenzano told investigators that he was playing cards with Stephen Andretta, Thomas Andretta's brother, in Union City, New Jersey, the day that Hoffa disappeared. Despite extensive surveillance and bugging, investigators found that the Mafia members whom they thought were involved were generally unwilling to talk about Hoffa's disappearance, even in private. On December 4, 1975, a federal investigator in Detroit said in court, presided by James Paul Churchill, that a witness had identified three New Jersey men as having participated "in the abduction and murder of James R. Hoffa." The three men were close associates of Provenzano: Thomas Andretta, Salvatore Briguglio and his brother Gabriel Briguglio.

Later in 1975, Michigan Attorney General Frank J. Kelley went to Waterford Township to supervise an unsuccessful digging expedition for Hoffa.

After years of investigation, involving numerous law enforcement agencies including the FBI, officials have not reached a definitive conclusion as to Hoffa's fate and who was involved. Hoffa's wife, Josephine, died on September 12, 1980, and is interred at White Chapel Memorial Cemetery in Troy, Michigan. On December 9, 1982, Hoffa was declared legally dead as of July 30, 1982, by Oakland County, Michigan Probate Judge Norman R. Barnard.

In 1989, Kenneth Walton, the agent-in-charge of the FBI's Detroit office, told The Detroit News that he knew what had happened to Hoffa. "I'm comfortable I know who did it, but it's never going to be prosecuted because we would have to divulge informants, confidential sources." In 2001, the FBI matched DNA from Hoffa's hair, taken from a brush, with a strand of hair found in Joseph Giacalone's car, but it is possible that Hoffa had traveled in the car on a different day.

On June 16, 2006, the Detroit Free Press published the entire "Hoffex Memo," a 56-page report prepared by the FBI for a January 1976 briefing on the case at the FBI headquarters in Washington. Although not claiming conclusively to establish the specifics of his disappearance, the memo records a belief that Hoffa was murdered at the behest of organized crime figures, who regarded his efforts to regain power in the Teamsters as a threat to their control of the union's pension fund. As of 2021, digs are still periodically conducted in the Detroit area in search of Hoffa's body, but a common theory among experts is that the body was cremated.

Claims and developments

Crime historians and investigators
There is wide agreement among crime historians and investigators that Hoffa was murdered on the order of his enemies in the Mafia. However, key details remain either unknown or unprovable, and this has ensured that no individuals have ever been charged in relation to the case.

In discussing potential motives, both the 1976 Hoffex Memo and scholarship prior to its release focus on Mafia opposition to Hoffa's plans to regain the Teamsters' leadership and the threat Hoffa posed to the Mafia's control over the union's pension fund. The Hoffex Memo noted that Provenzano was not senior enough to order a Mafia hit, though it did not rule out the possibility that his or someone else's personal vendetta against Hoffa was a motive. Scott Burnstein, a crime historian and journalist, argued in 2019 that Provenzano's role in the entire case was limited to acting as a lure.

Dan Moldea mentioned the possibility that Hoffa had retaliated against his Mafia opponents by co-operating with investigations against them. The Hoffex Memo includes this as a possible motivation. Vincent Piersante, the state government's former chief investigator into the Hoffa case, doubted that Hoffa could have seriously threatened the Mafia in this way, as any incriminating information he knew either would have incriminated himself or concerned crimes that were outside of the statute of limitations. Piersante suggested that the killing was accidental, and that the men who were sent to meet Hoffa were only meant to be "insultingly low-level messengers". He argued that Hoffa had no realistic prospects for a comeback, that the disappearance did not share the usual characteristics of a Mafia hit and that it risked encouraging action against organized crime (as indeed happened). This theory did not gain wide acceptance among criminologists.

In his 1991 book Hoffa, Arthur A. Sloane said that the most common theory of FBI investigators was that Russell Bufalino was the mob boss who ordered the murder, and Salvatore "Sally Bugs" Briguglio, his brother Gabriel Briguglio, Thomas Andretta and Charles "Chuckie" O'Brien were the men who lured Hoffa away from the restaurant. The theory is that O'Brien was used as an "unwitting dupe" to lure Hoffa away, because Hoffa was suspicious of Provenzano and would not have entered the car unless there was a familiar figure present. It is theorised O'Brien picked Hoffa up from the Machus Red Fox parking lot, and that Hoffa was killed either in the car or driven to an unspecified location to be killed. Keith Corbett, a former US Prosecuting Attorney, has since suggested that O'Brien would have been considered too unreliable to be entrusted with a role in such a high-profile murder. He instead suggested that Vito "Billy" Giacalone was the familiar figure.

The location of the murder is also unknown, but any violence in the restaurant parking lot would have easily attracted witnesses. Therefore, the Hoffex Memo suspects Hoffa was lured away to a different murder location. James Buccellato, a professor of Criminology and Criminal Justice at Northern Arizona University, suggested in 2017 that it was likely that Hoffa was murdered one mile away from the restaurant at the house of Carlo Licata, the son of the mobster Nick Licata.

Sloane listed a local waste incinerator and a landfill in Jersey City as the possible locations where the body was taken; the latter is also supported by Dan Moldea. Buccellato listed two waste incinerators and a crematorium, all in the Detroit area. He doubted the body had been transported a long distance: "It's just not practical." The Hoffex Memo similarly said: "If the Detroit LCN was used to assist in the disappearance, it is unknown why the body would be transported back to New Jersey when Detroit Organized Crime people have proven in the past that they are capable of taking care of such things."

Other accounts and speculation
In the book I Heard You Paint Houses: Frank "The Irishman" Sheeran and the Closing of the Case on Jimmy Hoffa (2004), author Charles Brandt writes that Frank Sheeran, an alleged professional killer for the mob and a longtime friend of Hoffa, confessed to killing him. According to the book, Sheeran claims O'Brien drove him, Hoffa, and fellow mobster Sal Briguglio to a house in Detroit, where he shot Hoffa twice in the back of the head. Further, in 2003, Sheeran admitted to reporters that he murdered Hoffa, although bloodstains found in the Detroit house in which Sheeran claimed the murder had happened were determined not to match Hoffa's DNA. The truthfulness of the book, including Sheeran's confessions to killing Hoffa, has been disputed by "The Lies of the Irishman”, an article in Slate by Bill Tonelli, and "Jimmy Hoffa and 'The Irishman': A True Crime Story?" by Harvard Law School Professor Jack Goldsmith, which appeared in The New York Review of Books. Buccellato doubts that the Mafia would have entrusted an Irish American with this role and also believes that Hoffa would have refused to travel that far from the restaurant.

Hoffa's body was rumored to be buried in Giants Stadium. In an episode of the Discovery Channel show MythBusters, "The Hunt for Hoffa", the locations in the stadium in which Hoffa was rumored to be buried were scanned with a ground penetrating radar. That was intended to reveal if any disturbances indicated a human body had been buried there, but no trace of any human remains was found. In addition, no human remains were found when Giants Stadium was demolished in 2010.

In one of his jailhouse confessions published in a biography released after his death in 2006, Richard Kuklinski claimed that he was part of a four-man team who kidnapped and murdered Hoffa. Former FBI agent Robert Garrity, who worked on the Hoffa case, dismissed Kuklinski's claims as a hoax. Other authorities have also stated that Kuklinski's involvement in Hoffa's disappearance is unlikely.

In 2012, Roseville, Michigan police took samples from the ground under a suburban Detroit driveway after a person reported having witnessed the burial of a body there around the time of Hoffa's 1975 disappearance. Tests by Michigan State University anthropologists found no evidence of human remains.

In January 2013, the reputed gangster Tony Zerilli implied that Hoffa was originally buried in a shallow grave, with a plan to move his remains later to a second location. Zerilli said the plans were abandoned and Hoffa's remains lay in a field in northern Oakland County, Michigan, not far from the restaurant in which he had been last seen. Zerilli denied any responsibility for or association with Hoffa's disappearance. On June 17, 2013, investigating the Zerilli information, the FBI was led to a property in Oakland Township, in northern Oakland County, which was owned by Detroit mob boss Jack Tocco. After three days, the FBI called off the dig. No human remains were found, and the case remains open.

Thomas Andretta, who died in 2019, and his brother Stephen, who reportedly died of cancer in 2000, were named by the FBI as suspects. Both were New Jersey Teamsters and reputed Genovese crime family mob associates. The FBI called Thomas Andretta a "trusted associate of Anthony Provenzano; reported to be involved in the disappearance of Hoffa."

In an April 2019 interview with DJ Vlad, the former Colombo crime family capo Michael Franzese stated that he was certain that Hoffa's disappearance had been mob-related, that he was aware of the location of Hoffa's body and of the identity of his shooter, and had tapes that revealed details of his disappearance. When pressed for information on Hoffa's body, Franzese said, "I can tell you that it's wet, that's for sure," and "Upon good information, again, I think I know who the real shooter was; still alive today, in prison." In a 2018, interview with Value entertainment Franzese also makes the ''it's wet'' claim and adds that ''it's deep''. He also claims that he has in his possession a recorded a tape that ''spells everything out'' and that he might release this at a later date.

In a deathbed statement, a landfill worker claimed to have buried Hoffa's body in a steel drum 15 feet below the surface in a landfill beneath the Pulaski Skyway in Jersey City, New Jersey. In October 2021, the FBI obtained a warrant and completed a site survey in the landfill. In July 2022, the FBI announced that "nothing of evidentiary value was discovered" from the survey.

Legacy
Hoffa's legacy remains controversial. Arthur Sloane wrote, "To many, Hoffa was a kind of latter-day Al Capone... others, he was... hugely successful in improving working conditions for [his truck-driver constituents]."

In film and fiction
In the 1978 film F.I.S.T., Sylvester Stallone plays Johnny Kovak, a character based on Hoffa. In the 1983 television miniseries Blood Feud, Hoffa is portrayed by Robert Blake. In the 1984 television film The Jesse Owens Story, Hoffa is portrayed by Tom Bosley.

In the 1984 Sergio Leone film Once Upon a Time in America syndicalist James Conway O'Donnell's character, played by Treat Williams, is inspired by Hoffa. In the 1985 television miniseries Robert Kennedy and His Times, Hoffa is portrayed by Trey Wilson. In the 1992 film Hoffa, Hoffa is portrayed by Jack Nicholson. Hoffa is portrayed by Thomas Wagner in the 1993 television film Marilyn & Bobby: Her Final Affair.

Author James Ellroy features a fictional historical version of Hoffa in the Underworld USA Trilogy novels as an important secondary character, most prominently in the novels American Tabloid (1995) and The Cold Six Thousand (2001).

In the 2003 comedy film Bruce Almighty, the titular character uses powers endowed by God to manifest Hoffa's body in order to procure a story interesting enough to reclaim his career in the news industry.

In the 2019 Martin Scorsese film The Irishman, which adapts the book I Heard You Paint Houses, Hoffa is portrayed by Al Pacino. Pacino was nominated for the Academy Award for Best Supporting Actor for his performance.

See also

List of people who disappeared
List of people pardoned or granted clemency by the president of the United States

References

Further reading

 Vendetta: Bobby Kennedy Versus Jimmy Hoffa (2016) by James Neff, excerpt
 Jimmy Hoffa's Hot, by John Bartlow Martin, 1959, Fawcett Publications, Greenwich, Conn.
 Hoffa and the Underworld, by Paul Jacobs, Dissent, vol. 6, no. 4 (Autumn 1959), pp. 435–445.
 The Enemy Within: The McClellan Committee's Crusade Against Jimmy Hoffa and Corrupt Labor Unions, by Robert F. Kennedy, 1960, Harper and Brothers, New York.
 The State of the Unions, by Paul Jacobs, 1963, Atheneum, New York.
 Tentacles of Power, by Clark Mollenhoff, 1965, World Publishing Company, Cleveland and New York.
 Hoffa! Ten Angels Swearing, by Jim Clay, 1965, Beaverdam Books, Beaverdam, Va.
 Hoffa and the Teamsters: A Study of Union Power, by Ralph James and Estelle James, 1965, Van Nostrand, New York.
 The Ominous Ear, by Bernard Spindel, 1968, Award House, New York.
 The Trials of Jimmy Hoffa: An Autobiography, by James R. Hoffa as told to Donald I. Rogers, 1970, Henry Regnery, Chicago, .
 Kennedy Justice, by Victor Navasky, 1971, Atheneum, New York.
 The Fall and Rise of Jimmy Hoffa, by Walter Sheridan, 1972, Saturday Review Press, New York.
 Hoffa: The Real Story, by James R. Hoffa as told to Oscar Fraley, 1975, Stein and Day, New York, .
 The Strange Disappearance of Jimmy Hoffa, by Charles Ashman and Rebecca Sobel, 1976, Manor Books, New York.
 The Teamsters, by Steven Brill, 1978, Simon & Schuster, New York, .
 Mafia Kingfish: Carlos Marcello and the Assassination of John F. Kennedy, by John H. Davis (author), 1989, McGraw-Hill, New York.
 Hoffa, by Arthur A. Sloane, 1991, MIT Press, Boston, .
 Hoffa, by Ken Englade, 1992, Harper Paperbacks, New York,  (Novelization based on David Mamet's screenplay of the 1992 film by 20th Century Fox).
 The Hoffa Wars: Teamsters, Rebels, Politicians and the Mob, 1978, first edition, by Dan Moldea, Paddington Press, New York and London, .
 The Hoffa Wars: Teamsters, Rebels, Politicians and the Mob, 1993, second edition, by Dan Moldea, SPI, New York.
 Mob Lawyer, by Frank Ragano and Selwyn Raab, 1994, Charles Scribner's Sons, .
 All-American Mobster, by Charles Rappleye and Ed Becker, [about John Roselli] Barricade Books, 1995, .
 Out of the Jungle: Jimmy Hoffa and the Remaking of the American Working Class, by Thaddeus Russell, 2001, Alfred A. Knopf, New York, .
 Watergate: The Hidden History, by Lamar Waldron, 2012, Counterpoint, Berkeley, California.
 I Heard You Paint Houses: Frank "The Irishman" Sheeran and the Inside Story of the Mafia, the Teamsters, and the Last Ride of Jimmy Hoffa [Paperback], by Charles Brandt

External links

 HDSI—Who Killed Jimmy Hoffa? Documentary produced by the PBS Series History Detectives
 Guide to James R. Hoffa Documentation Collection, 1954–1976, Special Collections Research Center, Estelle and Melvin Gelman Library, The George Washington University

 
1913 births
1982 deaths
1970s missing person cases
Abuse of the legal system
American people convicted of bribery
American people convicted of fraud
American people of German descent
American people of Irish descent
American people of Pennsylvania Dutch descent
American trade union officials convicted of crimes
Criminals from Indiana
Criminals from Michigan
Missing people
Missing person cases in Michigan
People declared dead in absentia
People from Brazil, Indiana
People from Detroit
Presidents of the International Brotherhood of Teamsters
Recipients of American presidential clemency
Trade unionists from Michigan
People from Oakland County, Michigan
20th-century American criminals